Banco de Gaia is an English electronic music project, formed in 1989 by Toby Marks (born 1964, South London, England).

The music of Banco de Gaia is mostly categorized as ambient dub and downtempo. Marks works to cross genres, often using Arabic and Middle Eastern samples against a bass heavy reggae, rock, or trance rhythm to produce deeply textured tracks that progress layer upon layer.

History
In 1978, Marks began his musical career as a drummer in a heavy metal band.

Marks moved to Portugal in 1986 and played Beatles music for tourists. He first delved into electronic music in 1989, when he bought a digital sampler. The first tune he recorded on it was called "Maxwell House".

Having cut his teeth on the early 1990s ambient dub compilations, in 1994 he released his first studio album Maya on the Planet Dog label, which was submitted to the Mercury Music Prize on its release. It was followed in 1995 by the critically acclaimed Last Train to Lhasa. Both albums reached No. 1 on the UK Indie Chart and featured in the top 40 of the UK Albums Chart. In the following decade, Marks released Live at Glastonbury, Big Men Cry, The Magical Sounds of Banco De Gaia, Igizeh and You Are Here.

In 1997, Marks put together a five-piece band that included Ted Duggan (drums), Ashley Hopkins (bass), Larry Whelan (wind synth, saxophone and ethnic flutes), and Gary Spacey-Foot (percussion and saxophones). The band reduced in number to just Marks, Duggan and Hopkins in 1999, and then just Marks and Duggan from 2000 until 2003, when Marks went back to being a solo artist.

On 20 September 2009, Marks played an album launch show for his album Memories Dreams Reflections at Dingwalls in London. This show was to celebrate 20 years of Banco de Gaia. Marks was joined on stage by three members from the original five-piece band: Hopkins, Whelan and Duggan and vocalist Maya Preece, who sang on the latest album.

He released a studio album Apollo on 8 April 2013, on his own Disco Gecko Recordings.

In 2015, Marks returned to playing with a live three-piece band, with Ted Duggan (drums) and James Eller (bass).

On 7 October 2016, he released his ninth studio album The 9th of Nine Hearts, featuring collaborations with Sophie Barker (Zero 7), Tim Bowness (No-Man), Dick Parry (Pink Floyd) and his band.

Discography

Early cassettes 
Medium (World Bank, 1991)
Freeform Flutes and Fading Tibetans (World Bank, 1992)
Deep Live (World Bank, 1992)
These first three albums existed only on tape and are no longer being sold due to copyright issues with several of the samples used on them.

Albums 
Maya (Planet Dog, 1994) – UK No. 34 	 		
Last Train to Lhasa (Planet Dog, 1995) – UK No. 31
Big Men Cry (Planet Dog, 1997)
The Magical Sounds of Banco de Gaia (Six Degrees Records, 1999)
Igizeh (Six Degrees, 2000)
You Are Here (Six Degrees, 2004)
Farewell Ferengistan (Six Degrees, 2006)
Memories Dreams Reflections (2009)
Apollo (2013)
Ollopa:Apollo Remixed (2013)
Maya: 20th Anniversary Edition (2014)
Last Train to Lhasa: 20th Anniversary Edition (2015)
The 9th of Nine Hearts (2016)
Big Men Cry: 20th Anniversary Edition (2017)
The Magical Sounds of Banco de Gaia: 20th Anniversary Edition (2019)
Igizeh: 20th Anniversary Edition (2020)

Live albums 
Live at Glastonbury (Planet Dog, 1996)
Live at Glastonbury: 20th Anniversary Edition (2016)

Compilation albums 
10 Years (2002)
10 Years Remixed (2003)
Songs from the Silk Road (2011)
Rewritten Histories Vol.1 1992 – 1995 (2011)
Rewritten Histories Vol.2 1996 – 2001 (2012)
Rewritten Histories Vol.3 2002 – 2013 (2014)
30 Times Around the Sun (2019)

EPs 
Desert Wind (1993)
Heliopolis (1994)
Last Train to Lhasa (1995)
Drunk as a Monk Mixes
I Love Baby Cheesy (1999)
Obsidian (2000)
Zeus No Like Techno / Gray Over Gray (2004)
Kara Kum Remixes (2006)
Wimble Toot (2013)
Apollon (2013)
All Sleeping (2013)
For Such a Time (2013)
Last Train to Lhasa 20th Anniversary EP (2015)
Le Foucauld (2016)
Warp and Weft (2016)
91 (2017)
The Princess and the Sky Goat (2017)
Ages of Gaia (2019)
Floatless (2020)
Kintsugi (2020)

References

External links

Interview with Toby Marks
[ Banco de Gaia at AllMusic]
Disco Gecko Recordings website
Banco De Gaia on Discogs

English electronic musicians
English techno musicians
English trance musicians
Remixers
1964 births
Living people
Downtempo musicians
Six Degrees Records artists